Stuart or Stewart Wallace may refer to:

Stuart Wallace (golfer), winner of Texas State Open
Stuart Wallace (sailor) in Laser World Championships
Stewart Wallace, composer

See also
Stewart Wallis, business manager